Beaumaris Bay is a bay in the east of Port Phillip, Victoria, Australia. 

Beaumaris Bay commences at the cliffs at Rickett's Point in the south of the suburb of Beaumaris, then stretches alongside Mentone Beach in Mentone through a string of suburban beaches south to Frankston. The northern shore is covered by Bayside and Kingston councils and the southern reaches are in Frankston council. 

The main streams and tributaries supplying the bay are Mordialloc Creek, Patterson River, and Kananook Creek.

References

Port Phillip